William MacMillan or McMillan may refer to:
Billy MacMillan (born 1943), Canadian ice hockey player and coach
Bill MacMillan (academic) (born 1950), British academic and former vice-chancellor of the University of East Anglia
William Duncan MacMillan (1871–1948), American mathematician and astronomer
William J. P. MacMillan (1881–1957), Canadian physician and Prince Edward Island politician
William McMillan (congressman) (1764–1804), delegate to the United States Congress from the Territory Northwest of the River Ohio
William McMillan (college president) (1777–1832), president of Jefferson College, 1817–1822
William McMillan (sculptor) (1887–1977), British sculptor and medal-designer
William McMillan (Australian politician) (1850–1926), Irish-Australian politician, first Member for Wentworth
William McMillan (sport shooter) (1929–2000), American sports shooter and Olympic Champion
William Hector McMillan (1892–1974), Liberal party member of the Canadian House of Commons
Billy McMillan (died 1991), Irish footballer
William McMillan (footballer, born 1872) (1872–1929), Scottish wing half who played for Southampton and Burnley in the late 1890s
William McMillan (footballer, born 1876) (1876–1958), Scottish full back/centre half who played for Lincoln City in the 1890s/1900s
William Macmillan (minister) (1927–2002), Moderator of the General Assembly of the Church of Scotland
William Miller Macmillan (1885–1974), Scottish historian
William L. McMillan (1936–1984), American physicist
Will McMillan (1944–2015), American actor
William Hutchison McMillan (1886–1947), Scottish mining engineer
William Northrup McMillan (1872–1925), American-born Kenyan settler, adventurer, and philanthropist